Balajinagar (Bantanda) is a village situated in Mangalwedha taluk, Solapur district, Maharashtra, India.

References 

Villages in Solapur district